Nicola Cirigliano (born 20 October 2000) is an Italian footballer who plays as a defender.

Career statistics

Notes

References

2000 births
Living people
Italian footballers
Association football defenders
U.S. Città di Pontedera players
A.S. Pro Piacenza 1919 players
Serie C players